Kook is a surname in various cultures.

Origins
As a Chinese surname, Kook approximates the Cantonese pronunciations of various distinct surnames, listed below by their spelling in Hanyu Pinyin (which reflects the Standard Mandarin pronunciation):
Gǔ, meaning "valley" or "gorge"
Jū, meaning "to bow"
Qū, meaning "curved"

The Dutch surname Kook originated both as an occupational surname for a baker of cakes or a cook, and as a variant spelling of the French surname Cocq ("rooster").

Kook is also a Jewish surname, a variant spelling of Kuk or Cook.

Statistics
In the Netherlands, there were 98 people with the surname Kook as of 2007.

Bearers of this surname frequently do not use the Revised Romanization spelling; in a study based on year 2007 applications for South Korean passports, 38% of the applicants with this surname chose to spell it as Kook, and 48% used the Yale and McCune–Reischauer spelling Kuk, as compared to only 10% whose chose the spelling Guk.

The 2010 United States Census found 522 people with the surname Kook, making it the 41,657th-most-common name in the country. This represented an increase from 484 (42,217th-most-common) in the 2000 Census. In both censuses, more than half of people with the surname Kook identified as non-Hispanic white, and about four-tenths as non-Hispanic Asian or Pacific Islander.

People
 Abraham Isaac Kook (1865–1935), Chief Rabbi in the British Mandate of Palestine, considered to be Israel's first Ashkenazi Chief Rabbi
 Zvi Yehuda Kook (1891–1982), son of the above, prominent Religious Zionist rabbi
 Edward Kook (1903–1990), American stage lighting engineer 
 Hillel Kook (1915–2001), nephew of Abraham Isaac Kook, prominent Revisionist Zionism activist during World War II
 Shannon Kook (born 1987), South African actor
 Gabie Kook (born 1988), South Korean YouTuber
 Kook Hae-seong (born 1989), South Korean baseball outfielder

See also
 Cook (disambiguation)

References

Abraham Isaac Kook
Multiple Chinese surnames
Dutch-language surnames
Jewish surnames
Korean-language surnames